Garrison Sanborn (born July 31, 1985) is an American football long snapper who is a free agent. He was signed by the Buffalo Bills as an undrafted free agent in 2009. He played college football at Florida State.

Early years 
Sanborn graduated from Tampa Jesuit in 2003 and lettered three years in football as a long snapper, linebacker (junior year) and center (senior year). He won the district championship all three years and advanced to the state semifinals as a senior. He also lettered for four years as a wrestler. His team won wrestling district titles in all four years and won the regional title and placed sixth in the state meet as a senior in the 189-pound class. He married Tara Sanborn in 2011, whom he met at Florida State University. They are united in their Catholic faith.

College career 
Sanborn played for Florida State from 2003 to 2007. He was redshirted in 2003.

Professional career

Buffalo Bills

Sanborn signed with the Buffalo Bills as an undrafted free agent in 2009. One of the most consistent in the NFL, Sanborn was among the highest paid long snappers. He signed a three-year deal prior to the 2014 season.

On March 6, 2017, Sanborn was released by the Bills.

Tampa Bay Buccaneers
On March 14, 2017, Sanborn signed with the Tampa Bay Buccaneers. On September 2, 2017, he was released in the final roster cuts at the end of the preseason, but was re-signed two days later.

On August 26, 2018, Sanborn was re-signed by the Buccaneers.

San Francisco 49ers
On September 23, 2019, Sanborn was signed by the San Francisco 49ers. He was released on October 23.

Tampa Bay Buccaneers
On December 18, 2020, Sanborn signed with the practice squad of the Tampa Bay Buccaneers. His practice squad contract with the team expired after the season on February 16, 2021.

On December 7, 2021, Sanborn was signed to the Buccaneers practice squad. He was released on December 13.

Jacksonville Jaguars
On December 28, 2022, Sanborn was signed to the Jacksonville Jaguars practice squad.

References

External links 
Buffalo Bills bio

1985 births
Living people
Jesuit High School (Tampa) alumni
Players of American football from Tampa, Florida
American football long snappers
Florida State Seminoles football players
Buffalo Bills players
Tampa Bay Buccaneers players
San Francisco 49ers players
Jacksonville Jaguars players